Events from the year 1944 in Argentina.

Incumbents
 President: Pedro Pablo Ramírez (until 25 February); Edelmiro Julián Farrell (from 25 February)
 Vice president: vacant (until 8 July); Juan Perón (from 8 July)

Governors
 Buenos Aires Province: 
 until 5 January: Faustino J. Legón 
 5 January-5 May: Julio O. Ojea
 5 May-19 July: Luis García Mata 
 19 July-27 December: Juan Carlos Sanguinetti
 from 27 December: Roberto M. Vanetta
 Mendoza Province: Aristóbulo Vargas Belmonte

Vice Governors
 Buenos Aires Province: vacant

Events

January
15 January – 1944 San Juan earthquake, produces nearly 7000 deaths, 12000 injured and destroyed the 90% of building in the city
22 January – Juan Perón and Eva Perón met during a fundraising for the aforementioned earthquake.

February
 Pedro Ramírez resigns as president, being replaced by Edelmiro Farrell

March
 Bernardo Houssay, Juan Lewis and Eduardo Menendez establish the Instituto de Biología y Medicina Experimental

April

May

June
 Juan Perón is appointed vice president.
 The United States and Britain remove their ambassadors from Argentina.

July

August
 The United States confiscate Argentine gold located in the US, and forbid commerce with Argentina.

September

October
 Sanction of the Rural laborer statute

November
16 November: First issue of the Rico Tipo comic book

December

Unknown date

Ongoing
 Argentina keeps a neutral stance in World War II, amid foreign pressure to join the war

Births
9 May – Paulina Vinderman, poet and translator
2 July – Vicente de la Mata, footballer
25 September – Susana Viau, journalist
date unknown – Susana Giménez, model, actress and TV presenter

Deaths
15 November - Cayetano Santos Godino, serial killer (born 1896)

See also
List of Argentine films of 1944

References

Bibliography
 

 
Years of the 20th century in Argentina